In cricket, a five-wicket haul (also known as a "five–for" or "fifer") refers to a bowler taking five or more wickets in a single innings. This is regarded as a notable achievement, and as of August 2014 only 23 bowlers have taken at least 20 five-wicket hauls at international level in their cricketing careers.

Clarence Victor "Clarrie" Grimmett (25 December 1891 – 2 May 1980), a leg spinner and right-hand batsman, was born in New Zealand though he played the bulk of his cricket in Australia.  He is thought by many to be one of the finest early spin bowlers, and is usually credited as the developer of the flipper. Grimmett made his first-class debut for Wellington at the age of 17. At that time, New Zealand was not a Test cricketing nation, and in 1914 he moved to neighbouring Australia to further his career.

Grimmett played 37 Tests between 1924 and 1936, taking 216 wickets at an average of just 24.21 runs apiece. He took a five-wicket haul on debut against England in Sydney in 1925. He became the first bowler to reach the milestone of taking 200 Test wickets, and is one of only four Test bowlers that played in their first Test after the age of thirty to take more than 100 wickets, the other three beings Dilip Doshi, Saeed Ajmal and Ryan Harris. He took an average of six wickets per match. Many wickets in the last four years of his Test career were taken bowling in tandem with fellow leg-spinner Bill O'Reilly. Grimmett remains the only bowler with career figures of over 200 wickets in fewer than 40 Tests. He took a five-wicket 'bag' on 21 occasions, seven times finishing with ten wickets or more in a match.

Grimmett was a Wisden Cricketer of the Year in 1931, the same year as Donald Bradman. He died in Adelaide in 1980, and was posthumously inducted into the Australian Cricket Hall of Fame in 1996 as one of the ten inaugural members.

On 30 September 2009, Clarrie Grimmett was inducted into the ICC Cricket Hall of Fame.

Key

Test five-wicket hauls

Test ten-wicket hauls 

Clarrie Grimmett took ten wickets in a Test Match on seven occasions, and sits equal fifth on the all-time Test bowling table for "Most ten-wickets-in-a-match". Among Australian bowlers he sits equal second (with Dennis Lillee) behind Shane Warne who took ten wickets in a Test in ten matches.

References

Grimmett, Clarrie
Grimmett, Clarrie